Patterson Creek is a stream in Allamakee County, Iowa, in the United States.

Patterson Creek was named for Seth and Darwin Patterson, pioneers who settled at the creek.

See also
List of rivers of Iowa

References

Rivers of Allamakee County, Iowa
Rivers of Iowa